A by-election was held for the Niuas Noble seat to the Legislative Assembly of Tonga on 22 May 2014. It was triggered by the death of the constituency's incumbent representative, Lord Fusituʻa, on 24 April 2014.

Candidates and voters
The Legislative Assembly sits seventeen People's Representatives, elected by the citizens, and nine Nobles' Representatives, elected by the nobility. The Niuas are the smallest of the four constituencies of the nobility, and the only one to elect only one representative. It covers the islands of Niuafoʻou and Niuatoputapu, and thus the lands allocated to three of the Kingdom's thirty-three titles of hereditary nobility. The holders of these three titles constitute the constituency's electorate, and its pool of candidates. Thus, the four nobles in the Niuas (Lord Fusituʻa, Lord Fotofili, Lord Maʻatu and Lord Tangipa) elect their representative among themselves. (In parallel, the Niuas also form a constituency for the people's vote. The Niuas send one noble and one people's representative to Parliament, in separate votes. The May 2014 by-election concerned only the nobility.)

Nobles do not officially stand as candidates, and none belong to any political party. Following the death of the incumbent Lord Fusituʻa, his son Mataʻiʻulua ‘i Fonuamotu inherited his title on May 6, and was thus able to participate in the by-election. The title of Maʻatu being vacant, there were only three nobles attached to the constituency.

In the November 2010 general election, the then-Lord Fusituʻa had been elected with a single vote cast:

Result
Two votes were cast, both for the new Lord Fusituʻa, who thereby replaced his late father in Parliament.

References

2014 elections in Oceania
2014 in Tonga
By-elections to the Legislative Assembly of Tonga
Politics of Tonga
Niuas